Dreamland Villa is a retirement community situated in Maricopa County, Arizona, United States. It was one of the first retirement communities built in Arizona. Begun as a development in 1959 by Ross Farnsworth, within fifteen years it encompassed 3000 homes.

In 1978, residents opposed annexation by the city of Mesa. In 1979, 80 percent of Dreamland Villa residents supported a county senior citizen zoning area, which limited residents to people over 50 years of age. The measure passed. At this time, around 5,200 people lived in Dreamland Villa.

References

External links
Dreamland Villa Retirement Community

Unincorporated communities in Arizona
Unincorporated communities in Maricopa County, Arizona